Topline Schools is a private coeducational day and boarding school that has been in operation since September 2007. The school is located in the Elelenwo residential neighborhood of Port Harcourt, Rivers State, Nigeria. The school provides boarding for children living within and those from outside the state or local government area. It has nursery, and primary-level and secondary-level schools.

Members of the Board of Governors
Chairman: Chief (Hon.) Edwin E. Osuegbu, FCA, FCTI
Member: HRH Eze G. B. Wodi (JP)
Member: Dr (Mrs) Abigail Afiesimama
Member: Engr. Godpower Wakama, FNSE
Member: Chief (Mrs) Adline Boma Osuegbu

References

External links

Schools in Port Harcourt
Boarding schools in Rivers State
Private schools in Rivers State
Co-educational boarding schools
2007 establishments in Nigeria
2000s establishments in Rivers State
Educational institutions established in 2007
Secondary schools in Rivers State
Elelenwo, Port Harcourt